Parabaris is a genus of beetles in the family Carabidae, containing the following species:

 Parabaris atratus Broun, 1881
 Parabaris hoarei Larochelle & Lariviere, 2005
 Parabaris lesagei Larochelle & Lariviere, 2005

References

Harpalinae